The term bluebonnet refers to the two species of Australian parrots in the genus Northiella. The genus name honours Australian ornithologist Alfred John North.

Species
The genus includes the following two species:

References

Broad-tailed parrots
Taxa named by Gregory Mathews